Zinc finger protein 106 homolog is a protein that in humans is encoded by the ZFP106 gene.

References

Further reading